

The Accredited Standards Committee X9 (ASC X9, Inc.) is an ANSI (American National Standards Institute) accredited standards developing organization, responsible for developing voluntary open consensus standards for the financial services industry in the U.S.

ASC X9 is the USA Technical Advisory Group (TAG) to the International Technical Committee on Financial Services ISO/TC 68 under the International Organization for Standardization (ISO), of Geneva, Switzerland, and submits X9 American National Standards to the international committee to be considered for adoption as international standards or ISO standards. Membership in ASC X9 is open to all U.S. domiciled companies and organizations in the financial services industry.

Domestic Role 
The Accredited Standards Committee X9 develops, establishes, maintains, and promotes standards for the Financial Services Industry in the United States in order to facilitate delivery of financial services and products.

Committees 
ASC X9 is composed of five Subcommittees based on Financial Services business sectors:
 X9A – Retail Payments (including mobile payments and a card not present fraud group);
 X9B – Checks and Back-office Operations (all things related to checks);
 X9C – Corporate Banking (B2B payments and the Balance Transaction Reporting Standard (BTRS) standard);
 X9D – Securities (stocks and bonds, CUSIP);  and
 X9F – Data & Information Security (methods and cryptography to secure financial data).

Standards 
Examples of X9 standards commonly used today in the US and around the world are:
 Paper and electronic check standards (X9 owns nearly 98% of the standardized real estate on the front and back of checks, the magnetic ink character record was originally developed by X9, the credit and debit card transactions standard operating all card transactions first developed under X9
 Numerous data security standards for financial services including the "PIN" - personal identification standard in wide use today.
 Data Encryption Standard (DES) and its successor Triple DES the current encryption security algorithm used in securing most banking transactions worldwide.

References

External links 
 

ISO member bodies
Key management
American National Standards Institute